Litovka is a rural locality (a village) in Kupriyanovskoye Rural Settlement, Gorokhovetsky District, Vladimir Oblast, Russia. The population was 16 as of 2010.

Geography 
Litovka is located 15 km west of Gorokhovets (the district's administrative centre) by road. Gavriltsevo is the nearest rural locality.

References 

Rural localities in Gorokhovetsky District